Kristopher "Kris" Prather (born January 1, 1992) of Plainfield, Illinois is an American professional ten-pin bowler who competes on the PBA Tour. He is known for winning the inaugural PBA Tour Playoffs on June 2, 2019 and the PBA Tournament of Champions on February 9, 2020. To date, Prather has won five PBA Tour titles, including two major championships.

Kris has been nicknamed "Shark" and "Shark Kent" (a play on Clark Kent). He is a member of the Roto Grip and Vise Grips pro staffs.

Amateur career
Prather bowled collegiately at Wichita State University in Wichita, Kansas. As an amateur, he won the 2012 Paragon Open in Grand Rapids, Michigan and finished second at the 2012 New Mexico Open.

As of January 2020, Prather is a member of Team USA. Prather was part of the rotating four-person team (with A. J. Johnson, Jakob Butturff and Andrew Anderson) that won the trios gold medal for Team USA at the 2021 International Bowling Federation (IBF) Super World Championships in Dubai.

On August 23, 2022, Prather and partner A. J. Johnson won Doubles gold for USA at the PanAm Bowling Champion of Champions event held in Rio de Janeiro, Brazil. He and Johnson were part of a USA sweep in Doubles, as Shannon O'Keefe and Bryanna Coté won Doubles gold in the women's event. Prather then won gold in Singles on August 25, which also earned him All-Events gold.

Professional career
After qualifying for the championship finals four times in 2018 and twice more in early 2019 without winning, Prather broke through with his first PBA title in the PBA Scorpion Championship, held at the 2019 World Series of Bowling in Allen Park, Michigan. Based on points earned during the first 13 events of the 2019 season, he qualified as the #9 seed for the inaugural PBA Tour Playoffs. He was the only player to make the final four who did not earn a first-round bye. He defeated #4 seed Anthony Simonsen in the semifinal round on June 1, then topped #7 seed Bill O'Neill on June 2 to take the championship and $100,000 first place prize. Originally, the PBA Tour Playoffs was considered a non-title event. However, on December 6, 2019, the PBA announced that Prather would retroactively be awarded a PBA title for his win, giving him his second career Tour title.

Kris was a member of the Portland Lumberjacks team, winners of the 2019 PBA League competition. He was again a member of the Lumberjacks when they successfully defended their PBA League title in 2020.

On February 9, 2020, Prather won the PBA Tournament of Champions held in Fairlawn, Ohio. As the #4 seed for the stepladder finals, he won all four matches, defeating four major titlists (Sean Rash, Jason Belmonte, Anthony Simonsen and Bill O'Neill) to capture his third PBA Tour title, first major, and second career $100,000 prize check.

On June 6, 2020, Prather won the PBA Strike Derby, a non-title made-for-TV event where competitors attempt to bowl as many strikes as possible in two minutes. Seeded #4 after rolling 10 strikes in the first round, Prather went on to defeat Anthony Simonsen in the championship (fourth) round, 7–6, to claim the win and the $25,000 top prize. On July 22, Prather was crowned the PBA's "King of the Lanes" in a three-day, non-title event. He won the fifth challenge match (of six) in the event over PWBA player Gazmine Mason, and dethroned the reigning King, Sean Rash in the next match. He then defended his crown against the sixth and final challenger, PBA Hall of Famer Pete Weber. Despite the 2020 season being shortened by COVID-19, Prather posted a new career high in earnings with $223,285.

On March 14, 2021, Prather won his fourth PBA Tour title (with partner Andrew Anderson) at the Roth-Holman PBA Doubles Championship.

Prather qualified as the No. 1 seed at the 2022 PBA Tournament of Champions, but fell short of winning for the second time in this event when he was defeated by No. 2 seed Dominic Barrett in the final match. Two weeks later, Prather won the 2022 PBA World Championship as the No. 1 seed, defeating Jason Sterner in an exciting final match that required a one-ball, sudden death roll-off after the two tied the regulation game, 237–237. Prather won the roll-off 10–6 to win his second major and third career $100,000 prize check.

In addition to his five national PBA Tour titles, Prather has earned two PBA Regional Tour titles. He has rolled 28 certified perfect 300 games, including five in PBA Tour competition, and has 11 certified 800 series.

PBA Tour titles
Major championships are in bold type.

 2019 PBA Scorpion Championship (Allen Park, Michigan)
 2019 PBA Tour Playoffs (Portland, Maine)
 2020 PBA Tournament of Champions (Fairlawn, Ohio)
 2021 Roth-Holman PBA Doubles Championship w/Andrew Anderson (Tampa, Florida)
 2022 PBA World Championship (Wauwatosa, Wisconsin)

Non-title PBA wins
 2019 PBA League (Portland Lumberjacks)
 2020 PBA League (Portland Lumberjacks)
 2020 PBA Strike Derby
 2020 PBA King of the Lanes
 2022 PBA League (Portland Lumberjacks)

Career statistics
Statistics are through the last full PBA Tour season.

+CRA = Championship Round Appearances

References

American ten-pin bowling players
1992 births
Living people